Butterton is a civil parish in the district of Staffordshire Moorlands, Staffordshire, England. It contains nine listed buildings that are recorded in the National Heritage List for England. All the listed buildings are designated at Grade II, the lowest of the three grades, which is applied to "buildings of national importance and special interest".  The parish contains the village of Butterton and the surrounding countryside.  The listed buildings consist of farmhouses and farm buildings, cottages, a church, a bridge, and two mileposts.


Buildings

References

Citations

Sources

Lists of listed buildings in Staffordshire
Staffordshire Moorlands